Coombe is a settlement in the English county of Gloucestershire. It is adjacent to the town of Wotton-under-Edge. The town name can also be found spelled C-o-m-b-e

References

External links

Villages in Gloucestershire
Stroud District